Eagles Nest Airport  is a privately owned, public use airport located in Potters Hill, a census-designated place in Duplin County, North Carolina, United States.

Facilities 
Eagles Nest Airport covers an area of 8 acres (3 ha) at an elevation of 115 feet (35 m) above mean sea level. It has one runway designated 13/31 with a turf surface measuring 1,850 by 75 feet (564 x 23 m).

References

External links 
 Aerial image as of March 1993 from USGS The National Map
 

Defunct airports in North Carolina
Airports in North Carolina
Buildings and structures in Duplin County, North Carolina